Charles O'Flynn (1897–1964) was an American songwriter. He was active during the Tin Pan Alley era - specifically from 1921 to 1947.  One of O'Flynn's most famous lyrics was for the popular song "Smile, Darn Ya, Smile", which later appeared in Robert Zemeckis's Who Framed Roger Rabbit.

Partial list of published songs
1921: "Dr. Jazz's Raz-Ma-Taz" - c: Joe Rose
1925: "Play Me Slow" - c: Hagen
1926: "When You Waltz With The One You Love" - m: Al Sherman and w: Charles O'Flynn
1929: "Where The Bab Bab Babbling Brook (Goes Bub Bub Bubbling By)" - w: Harry Pease and Charles O'Flynn; m: Ed G. Nelson
1930: "Roses are Forget-Me-Nots" - c/l O'Flynn, Will Osborne and Al Hoffman
1930: "Swinging in a Hammock" - lyric O'Flynn and Tot Seymour; c. Pete Wendling
1930: "Jungle Drums" - c. Ernesto Lecuona; w: O'Flynn and Carmen Lombardo. This song was used in Dancing Co-Ed
1930: "Good Evening" - Tot Seymour, O'Flynn, and Al Hoffman 
1930: "In My Heart, It's You" - Charles O'Flynn with Max Rich and Al Hoffman 
1930: "I'm Tickled Pink With a Blue-Eyed Baby" - c. Pete Wendling
1930: "On a Blue and Moonless Night" - c/l: O'Flynn, Will Osborne and Al Hoffman 
1931: "Smile, Darn Ya, Smile" - l: O'Flynn and Jack Meskill; c: Max Rich
1931: "Yes or No" (c. Max Rich. From Road to Singapore
1932: "I'm Sure of Everything But You" - c: Pete Wendling and George W. Meyer 
1932: "Strangers" - c: J. Fred Coots
1933: "Three of Us" - c: Lee David, Pete Wending
1934: "Sweetie Don't Grow Sour On Me - c: Thomas "Fats" Waller 
1934: "Neighbors" - l: O'Flynn and James Cavanaugh; c. Frank Weldon
1935: "Gypsy Violin" - W&M: Charles O'Flynn, Jack Betzner
1939: "After All I've Been to You" - c: David and Redmond
1947: "Something For Nothing" - m: Willard Robison; w: Charles O'Flynn

Other songs
 "Hawaiian Sandman" - w: Charles O'Flynn- m: F. Henri Klickmann

References 

American male songwriters
1897 births
1964 deaths
20th-century male musicians